Johannes Cornelis Adrianus "Jo" Mommers (12 June 1927 – 13 March 1989) was a Dutch footballer who played as a forward. He competed in the men's tournament at the 1952 Summer Olympics.

Born in Tilburg, Mommers started his football career at local club GUDOK before moving to the main club in the city, Willem II at age 17. He broke his leg in a 3–1 loss to NAC, where he collided with opposing player Louis Overbeeke.

Honours
Willem II
Netherlands Football League Championship: 1951–52, 1954–55

References

1927 births
1989 deaths
Dutch footballers
Association football forwards
Netherlands international footballers
Olympic footballers of the Netherlands
Footballers at the 1952 Summer Olympics
Footballers from Tilburg